The 1964 PGA Championship was the 46th PGA Championship, played July 16–19 at Columbus Country Club in Columbus, Ohio. Bobby Nichols won his only major title, three strokes ahead of runners-up Jack Nicklaus and Arnold Palmer. Nichols led wire-to-wire after a first round 64 in the hometown of Nicklaus, who shot a 64 in the final round to gain his third runner-up finish in majors in 1964.
 
Ben Hogan, age 51, competed at the PGA Championship for the first time since 1960. Tied for fifth place after a third round 68, he finished tied for ninth for his penultimate top ten in a major. His final top ten came at the 1967 Masters.

Nichols' winning score of 271 was the lowest to date at the PGA Championship, the seventh as a 72-hole stroke play championship. It stood as the record for thirty years, until Nick Price's 269 in 1994.

Nichols' win marked the third time that all of the professional major championships were won by Americans in a calendar year.

The British Open was played the previous week in St Andrews, Scotland, one of five times in the 1960s that these two majors were played in consecutive weeks in July. The PGA Championship moved permanently to August in 1969 (except 1971, when it was played in late February).

Past champions in the field

Made both cuts

Missed the second cut

Missed the first cut

Source:

Round summaries

First round
Thursday, July 16, 1964

Second round
Friday, July 17, 1964

Third round
Saturday, July 18, 1964

Final round
Sunday, July 19, 1964

References

External links
PGA Media Guide 2012
PGA.com – 1964 PGA Championship

PGA Championship
Golf in Ohio
Sports competitions in Columbus, Ohio
PGA Championship
PGA Championship
PGA Championship
PGA Championship